Double Equals (stylized as ==) is the first album by the hardcore punk band Raw Radar War.

Release history
It was first released on limited CD-R on Traktor7 : black hand painted/stamped CD-R that comes in a dark navy four-fold cardboard package with a folded, photocopied insert. It was then re-released on CD by Shifty Records (in collaboration with TRAKTOR7 Records) : black & white "==" logo with Morse code silk-screened on CD. Packaged in black four-fold custom paperboard case with silver silk-screened full-panel artwork on the exterior and full lyrics/credits on the interior. Finally, he was released on 12" vinyl by Land o' Smiles : limited to 500 copies on heavy vinyl. Comes in a gatefold, hand silkscreened jacket without any info on it.

CD version
Track listing

12" vinyl LP version

2007 debut albums
Raw Radar War albums